Cynoglossopsis is a genus of flowering plants belonging to the family Boraginaceae.

Its native range is Northeastern Tropical Africa.

Species:

Cynoglossopsis latifolia 
Cynoglossopsis somaliensis

References

Boraginaceae
Boraginaceae genera